Christian Secondary Commercial School is a government secondary school in the city of Uyo, Akwa Ibom State of Nigeria. It one of the notable oldest secondary schools in Akwa Ibom state.

References 

Schools in Akwa Ibom State